Naseema Hafeez Panezai is a Pakistani politician who had been a member of the National Assembly of Pakistan, from June 2013 to May 2018

Political career

She was elected to the National Assembly of Pakistan as a candidate of Pashtunkhwa Milli Awami Party on a reserved seat for women from Balochistan in 2013 Pakistani general election.

References

Living people
Baloch people
Pakistani MNAs 2013–2018
People from Balochistan, Pakistan
Women members of the National Assembly of Pakistan
Year of birth missing (living people)
21st-century Pakistani women politicians